Chloropales is a genus of bristle flies in the family Tachinidae. There are at least two described species in Chloropales.

Species
These two species belong to the genus Chloropales:
 Chloropales fingens (Walker, 1865) c
 Chloropales luteifacies Mesnil, 1950 c g
Data sources: i = ITIS, c = Catalogue of Life, g = GBIF, b = Bugguide.net

References

Further reading

External links

 
 

Tachinidae